Civic Chandran (born 5 April 1951) is an Indian playwright, poet, editor, former Naxalite, social activist and political commentator from Kerala. He is the editor of Patabhedam magazine. He was instrumental in popularising street theatre in Kerala and is a strong critic of Kerala's mainstream left.

Life
He was born on 5 April 1951 in Murikungal village near Kodakara in Trichur district. He was the eldest of four children born to Velappan and Lakshmi. His birth name was C. V. Kuttan. From 1968 to 1981 he worked as a teacher in Wayanad and Eranad. In 1981, he was suspended from the job on charges of Naxalite links. Following the acquittal by the High Court, he returned to teaching in 1991. Now retired, he lives in West Hill, Calicut. He was married to P. Sridevi, who died some years before. Their elder daughter Kabani is a translator and the younger daughter Harita is an architect.

In July 2022, a complaint was lodged against Civic Chandran for sexually assaulting a woman activist.

Career
Civic was a member of the editorial board of Yanan magazine. This magazine was later confiscated by the government. He was imprisoned during the Emergency. He edited an anthology of poems titled Thadavara Kavithakal (Poems from Prison). He notes that political prisoners like him started to write poems in prison as part of survival and resistance.

Civic was the secretary of Janakiya Samskarika Vedi and editor of its mouthpiece Prerana. Civic was instrumental in popularising street theatre in Kerala. The magazines Vakku and Patabhedam were published under his leadership. In 1995, he staged the play Ningal Aare Communist Akki (Who did you make a communist), a counter drama based on Thoppil Bhasi's Ningal Enne Communist Akki (You made me a communist). The play sparked off a storm by taking an unsparing look at mainstream communism, calling it anti-Dalit and patriarchal. The play also led to the Civic Chandran v. Ammini Amma case, a landmark case in Indian copyright law.

Civil is a regular columnist in magazines and newspapers and writes about cultural issues. Civic is a distinct voice in Kerala's cultural arena, often clashing with and opposing the traditional left. He handled columns in Madhyamam and India Today. He is now the editor of Pathabhedam magazine.

Works
 Poetry
 Thadavara Kavithakal (ed.)
 Velichathekurichoru Gitam
 Griha Pravesam
 Valathuvasam Chernnu Nadakkuka (2017)

 Plays
 Kurisu Yuddham Thudangunnavar
 Thamrapathrangal (Akshouhini)
 Ningal Aare Communist Akki
 Ezhupathukalil Sambhavichath
 Agnaye Idam Na Mama
 Ningal Enthinanu Ente Kuttiye Perumazhayathu Nirthiyirikunath (2012)

 Essays
 Antennayil Kattu Pidikkumpol
 Karinkanna Nokkanda (2001)
 Gamayude Paitrukam

 Memoirs
 Ezhupathukal Vilichappol (2009)

References

External links
 "Interview With Civic Chandran" at RCW Asia
 Articles
 Civic Chandran (14 May 2017). "In the wake of the Spring Thunder". The Indian Express
 Civic Chandran (5 March 2018). "Give Land, Life and Self-Rule For Adivasis Before Another Madhu is Lynched". Countercurrents.org
 Civic Chandran (13 November 2020). "അങ്ങനെയാണ് ആക്ടിവിസത്തിലേക്ക് പൊട്ടിച്ചിരി കടന്നുവന്നത്...". Truecopythink.media (in Malayalam)

Malayalam-language writers
Malayalam-language dramatists and playwrights
Malayalam poets
Malayalam-language journalists
Dramatists and playwrights from Kerala
Indian columnists
Indian magazine editors
1951 births
People from Thrissur district
Living people
Indian human rights activists
Activists from Kerala
Dalit activists